Club Estudiantes de La Plata ( lit. "Students from La Plata"), simply referred to as Estudiantes de La Plata , is an Argentine professional sports club based in La Plata. The club's football team currently competes in the Primera División, where it has spent most of its history.

The club is a successful team in Argentina. In 1967, Estudiantes was the first team outside the traditional "big five" to win a professional league title. It has won four additional league titles and has had greater international success, having won six international titles. Estudiantes' international title championships are four Copa Libertadores (including three straight from 1968 to 1970), an Intercontinental Cup, and an Interamerican Cup.

The club was founded in 1905 when a group of players and fans decided to break away from Gimnasia de La Plata, which favored indoor sport rather than football. Matches between the two clubs are known as the Clásico Platense.

Other sports where Estudiantes competes are basketball, team handball, field hockey, golf, swimming, judo, and volleyball.

History

First years
In 1905, a group of football players and fans in the city of La Plata decided to break away from Gimnasia y Esgrima, the major club in the city, since Gimnasia's management neglected football after the closure of their field on 13th and 71st streets.

Thus, on August 4, 1905, in the shoestore "New York" on 7th Street, between 57 and 58 of the city of La Plata, the club was founded under the name "Club Atlético Estudiantes". Its first president, Miguel Gutiérrez, was elected on the very same night, when the club charter was drafted by card-carrying member #1, Alfredo Lartigue. Since its inception, the organization primarily was dedicated to football, but over the years the club expanded and incorporated basketball, handball, field hockey, tennis, swimming and golf, among others.

In those days, teams like Lomas A.C., Quilmes, Belgrano A.C., Estudiantil Porteño, San Isidro and Argentino de Quilmes, among others, faced each other in successive tournaments organized by the Argentine Football Association with Alumni (graduates of the Buenos Aires English High School) being one of the most successful.

On 28 February 1906 Estudiantes adopted a jersey design of striped red and white, in honor of Alumni, that had won ten championships between 1900 and 1911. However, during the early years, Estudiantes had to use a red shirt with a white stripe in the chest, because league authorities decided the uniform was too similar to Alumni's.

First title

The first pitch of the club was located at the intersection of 19th and 53rd streets in La Plata (now Plaza Islas Malvinas), with the first match being played on November 7, 1905, when Estudiantes faced Nacional Juniors from Buenos Aires. A year later, Estudiantes enrolled in the Associación Amateurs de Football (AAF). The stadium on 1st Avenue opened on 25 December 1907.

Estudiantes' first achievement was the 1911 Primera B title which allowed the team to play at the top tier of Argentine football, Primera División. Just two years later Estudiantes won its first title in Primera, playing at the dissident Federación Argentina de Football (FAF). That season the team disputed 18 matches, winning 14 with only 1 lost and scoring 64 goals (with an average of 3,55 goals per match).

In 1914 Estudiantes made another great campaign but the team finished second to Porteño. 1919 saw Estudiantes finishing second to champion Boca Juniors although the Association put an end to the tournament with 14 fixtures still to be played. The Association alleged that "the championship took longer than expected" so it was suddenly finished.

In subsequent years, Estudiantes made irregular campaigns, in some cases finishing at the bottom of the table. Nevertheless, the team made a great performance in 1928 when finishing third to champion Huracán and Boca Juniors. The last year of amateur era saw Estudiantes being runner-up to Boca Juniors. The team totalized 56 points in 35 matches, with 27 won and 7 losses.

"The Professors"

When professionalism was adopted in Argentine football in 1931, Estudiantes had a famous offensive lineup: Miguel Ángel Lauri, Alejandro Scopelli, Alberto Zozaya, Manuel Ferreira and Enrique Guaita, known as Los Profesores ("The Professors"), and still regarded as one of Argentina's all-time finest . Alberto Zozaya scored the first goal of professional football in Argentina and was the top goalscorer of the first professional tournament. Ferreira played for the national team in the 1928 Olympic Games and the 1930 World Cup; Guaita and Scopelli played for Italian national team that won the 1934 FIFA World Cup. Saúl Calandra, the Sbarra brothers (Raúl and Roberto) and Armando Nery were feared defensive players.

In 1937, a pioneering lighting system was installed in the stadium, allowing night games to be played.

The 1950s saw the emergence of goalkeeper Gabriel Ogando, and players such as Walter Garcerón, Alberto Bouché, Juan Urriolabeitía, Ricardo Infante, Héctor Antonio, as well as the final seasons of striker Manuel Pelegrina, who remains Estudiantes' all-time top scorer with 221 goals. Following a confrontation with the Peronist government of Buenos Aires Province, the club's management was removed by authorities (allegedly for refusing to distribute copies of Eva Perón's book to club members) The government-appointed management disbanded the team: top scorers Infante and Pelegrina signed with Huracán. The decimated team was relegated in 1953, but after the return of Pelegrina (who tricked Huracán by becoming a free agent without the club's consent) , Estudiantes was promoted the following year. The club was allowed to govern itself soon thereafter.

In the 1960s, Miguel Ignomiriello coached the Estudiantes under-19 team known as La Tercera que Mata ("The Killer Juveniles"), which would evolve, with a few acquisitions, into the team coached by Osvaldo Zubeldía that won the 1967 Metropolitano championship. With this title, Estudiantes became the first club outside the "big five" (Boca Juniors, River Plate, Racing Club, Independiente and San Lorenzo) to obtain a professional title. This opened the floodgates, and soon other "small" clubs would do likewise (Vélez Sársfield in 1968, Chacarita Juniors one year later, and soon other teams joined as well).

International success

Estudiantes went on to win the Copa Libertadores three years in a row (1968, 1969 and 1970), and the 1968 Intercontinental Cup against Manchester United. The latter game is still remembered for the violent behaviour of Estudiantes' players. They lost the Intercontinental title against A.C. Milan (1969) and Feyenoord (1970). Estudiantes won the maiden edition of the Copa Interamericana in a three-legged final against the reigning CONCACAF title-holders, Mexican club Toluca (the games were played in 1969, but official references call it the 1968 edition).

The last part of the Zubeldía era was marred by the antics of some players. Following a violent Intercontinental match against Milan, the entire team was arrested on orders from Argentine President Juan Carlos Onganía. In an unprecedented step, goalkeeper Alberto Poletti was suspended for life (he was later pardoned) and did time in jail, together with teammates Ramón Aguirre Suárez and Eduardo Luján Manera. Because of these events, it became a cliché to refer to Zubeldía's football as el antifútbol ("the anti-football"), because of its physical violence, and its frequent resort to timewasting tactics . The Times commented that Estudiantes is "one of the most despicable teams ever to emerge from South America."

Zubeldía hired former referees to lecture the team on regulations, so that his players would be able to exploit every loophole in the book. Also, he incorporated tactics that were unheard of at the time, such as playbook drills for free-kicks and corner kicks, the offside trap, and double-marking opponents .

The Zubeldía team counted two physicians among its stars: Carlos Bilardo and Raúl Madero graduated from the University of Buenos Aires Faculty of Medicine during their playing days. Juan Ramón Verón was a gifted player who could play left wing, but would also join the midfielders or attack from the right. He profited from the no-nonsense playing of Marcos Conigliaro, Juan Miguel Echecopar and Madero, and the tactical guidance provided by Bilardo. Right-back Eduardo Luján Manera was a very talented player, but suffered from repeated injuries and did not reach his full potential. Fullback Aguirre Suárez was noted for his often violent play, and so was Luis Medina.

After the 1970 season, Carlos Bilardo retired from play and got involved in his family's furniture business. As the team's fortunes were declining and relegation seemed a possibility, he was called by management in mid-1971 to coach the team. Under his guidance, Estudiantes lost the 1975 Nacional title in the last day of play and made it to the 1976 Copa Libertadores.

Carlos Bilardo era
In the ensuing years, Bilardo alternated between coaching Estudiantes and Colombian teams. He was briefly the coach of the Colombia national team, but was called again by Estudiantes in 1982. Soon after, the team won the 1982 Metropolitano championship. Under his successor Eduardo Luján Manera, also a member of the Zubeldía's team, Estudiantes won the 1983 Nacional tournament as well. Both wins were at the expense of a star-studded Independiente.

Those championship teams were anchored by a solid defense (Julián Camino on the right and Abel Ernesto Herrera on the left were also fearsome attackers, and José Luis Brown provided security as a sweeper), and also had three creative midfielders (José Daniel Ponce, Alejandro Sabella and Marcelo Trobbiani, with Miguel Ángel Russo to guard their backs) and two top-notch strikers (Hugo Gottardi and Guillermo Trama).

Bilardo went on to coach the Argentina national football team, that won the 1986 FIFA World Cup. The captain of Estudiantes' 1982 champions, José Luis Brown, scored the opening goal in the final match against West Germany. Four years later, Bilardo's Argentina reached the final of the 1990 FIFA World Cup. Madero was team physician for both events, and Ricardo Echevarría, also from Estudiantes, was fitness coach.

Decline and return to success

Estudiantes was relegated for the second time after the 1993–94 season, and again returned to the first division the very next season, which was the breakout year for Juan Sebastián Verón (son of former player Juan Ramón). In the ensuing years, the club had irregular results, and became known mostly as the breeding ground for strikers such as Martín Palermo, Luciano Galletti, Bernardo Romeo, Ernesto Farías and Mariano Pavone, as well as other quality players such as José Ernesto Sosa and Pablo Piatti.

Bilardo returned as coach in 2003, with new management bent on rebuilding the club in his winning ways. Some young players were promoted, such as Marcos Angeleri and José Ernesto Sosa. When Bilardo departed, the team remained a contender under coaches Reinaldo Merlo and Jorge Burruchaga. The team made history when it came from behind (0–3 at half-time) to win 4–3 against Peruvian Sporting Cristal in a Libertadores match played on 21 February 2006.

On May 18, 2006, Burruchaga was replaced by another former Argentine international, Diego Simeone, who built the team around Juan Sebastián Verón, who returned to Estudiantes after 11 years. Simeone's team was eliminated by São Paulo in a penalty shoot-out in the quarter-finals of the 2006 Copa Libertadores, but went on to an impressive campaign in the local league during the 2006 Apertura. It amassed ten consecutive wins (tying the club record), including an unprecedented 7–0 win against Gimnasia in the La Plata derby, played 15 October 2006. Estudiantes finished the regular season tied for first place with Boca Juniors (per Argentine league rules, goal difference is not used to determine the champion). A winner-take-all final match was played on December 13, 2006. Estudiantes came from behind to defeat Boca Juniors 2–1, thus securing its first division title in 23 years. During this campaign, Estudiantes defeated all the "big five", allowed the fewest goals, and three of their players (Pavone, Verón and Braña) were ranked as the league's top three by sports diary Olé.

Simeone left the team after the 2007 Apertura, and was replaced by former S.S. Lazio teammate Roberto Sensini. After a weak finish in the 2008 Clausura, Sensini was replaced with Leonardo Astrada. Under his guidance, Estudiantes reached the final of the 2008 Copa Sudamericana, which it lost to Brazilian side SC Internacional. Shortly thereafter, a string of bad results caused Astrada's departure.

In March 2009, former player Alejandro Sabella became head coach, his first such engagement (his coaching experience was limited to being an assistant to Daniel Passarella). The team improved their standing in the local league and advanced to the final of the 2009 Copa Libertadores, winning 2–1 on aggregate over Cruzeiro after a goal-less draw in La Plata and an away win on 15 July 2009. Verón was chosen as the competition's most valuable player, and Mauro Boselli was its top goalscorer, with a decisive header in the final match. Thus, Estudiantes earned the right to play the 2009 FIFA Club World Cup in Abu Dhabi.

In that event, Estudiantes won their semifinal match against Pohang Steelers 2–1, and lost the final against FC Barcelona 2–1 in extra time, after a 1–1 tie in regulation time.

After the Club World Cup participation, Estudiantes finished second in the 2010 Clausura (with local favorite José Sosa playing on loan), and won the 2010 Apertura after a protracted battle against Vélez Sarsfield. The team was in transition following the departure of Sosa and the sales of Boselli, right back Marcos Angeleri, and other key players.

Facilities

Jorge Luis Hirschi Stadium is located on 1st Avenue, between 55th and 57th Streets, in La Plata. It has capacity for 35,530 people. In March 2022 a new corner stand was added with capacity for an additional 2,200 people.

In its previous incarnation (1907 to 2005) the stadium had room for 23,000. The wooden stands behind the goal-lines were standing-room only. The stands next to the avenue were sitting-room, and were separated from the avenue by a row of tile trees. The opposite side was roofed and had the best seating arrangements. The noisiest fans used to occupy the 55th Street popular, while visiting fans were often directed to the 57th St. popular, opposite a technical high school (whose inconvenient location was responsible for the relatively small size of the pitch, at 105 x 68 m).

For some international games in the Zubeldía era, Estudiantes played in Boca Juniors' La Bombonera, noted for its intimidating acoustics.

With the erection of Estadio Ciudad de La Plata in the 1990s, both Estudiantes and Gimnasia decided initially against relocating their home games. However, Estudiantes's field was closed down in September 2005 because of new safety regulations which forbid standing-only wooden stands. This began a sequence of political infighting between the club and City Hall. Estudiantes played some home games in the nearby Gimnasia stadium, and later used Quilmes Atlético Club's Centenario field. There, Estudiantes made history with a come-from-behind 4–3 Libertadores win against Sporting Cristal.

In April 2006 a court decree allowed the re-opening of 1 y 57, but mayor Julio Alak intervened again to prevent this from happening. Renovation work on the stadium started in 2007, and met with opposition from several groups, notably the "Hoja de Tilo" NGO, who claims that the works would damage the environmental balance of the park behind the stadium.

While using the city stadium, Estudiantes earned five consecutive derby wins, and had a streak of 37 games undefeated in the local league (2007–2009). When roofing work began in August 2009 to install a new roof in the city stadium, Estudiantes moved once again to Quilmes, and alternated both locations until the stadium was re-opened in November 2019. The new stadium has LED lighting, playmaster surface, and features amenities such as shopping and restaurants underneath the stands.

Estudiantes' training grounds are located in the Country Club premises in City Bell, north of La Plata.

Supporters
Within the La Plata area, Estudiantes was traditionally regarded as the club of the middle class, while rival side Gimnasia y Esgrima was identified with the working class. This characterization is not necessarily anchored in reality. While the two clubs have roughly the same pull in La Plata, Estudiantes has more of a nationwide following, especially after its international successes in the 1960s. There used to be much discussion about which club has the larger following, but Estudiantes seems to have pulled forward.

For several periods in the club's history, a group of supporters from Buenos Aires (los porteños) were a powerful element within the fan base. One of the fans from 1960s to the 1990s was Raúl Bernechea, known as el pelapapas (the "potato peeler") after his job as a kitchen hand; he was noted for lighting bonfires during games, juggling and performing other stunts .

Author Ernesto Sabato was an Estudiantes sympathizer, and was honored with a ceremony where he was awarded a No. 10 jersey. Political essayist Arturo Jauretche mentioned Estudiantes in one of his books .

Other noted fans include tennis player Juan Mónaco, actors Jorge and Federico D'Elía, philosopher Darío Sztajnszrajber, journalist Mauro Szeta, human rights activist Estela de Carlotto, filmmaker and politician Fernando Solanas, and sports journalist Osvaldo Príncipi.

In the 1983 presidential election, Estudiantes fans were, together with their peers from Vélez Sársfield, the first to voice their support for eventual winner Raúl Alfonsín in his bid against the Peronistas. The friendship with Vélez supporters has since vanished, especially after an Estudiantes win denied Vélez the 2003 championship.

Estudiantes is on friendly terms with several clubs from the South side of Greater Buenos Aires; especially Quilmes and Témperley. Platense, from the North side of Greater Buenos Aires, held a special place in the hearts of Estudiantes fans for some time, as it cemented Gimnasia's relegation in 1979.

Estudiantes is also friendly with the Uruguayan fan base of Peñarol, once their classic Libertadores rivals.

Estudiantes shares colors with Spanish side Athletic Bilbao, and during a period in the 1950s, both institutions shared a reputation for confronting the government (Bilbao as a Basque nationalist side against the Franco regime, and Estudiantes against Peronism). During these times, Bilbao donated a set of jerseys to Estudiantes. The relationship has been rekindled in the 2000s through Argentine expatriates and partisan blogs .

Nicknames
The nickname pincharratas (rat stabbers), often shortened to pinchas, comes from the nickname of Felipe Montedónica, who spent much time chasing after rats in the La Plata market in the 1910s and 1920s, and hence was known as "el pincharratas". Pictures exist of Montedónica with some of the players, where his nickname is mentioned . Traditionally, the nickname is also associated with the laboratory work done by the many Medicine students among the club's early members.

This nickname extends to the fans. It is common to hear fans say "soy del pincha" ("I am pincha").

Fans also call the team el león (the lion), el orgullo de la ciudad (the pride of the city), los capos de La Plata (the bosses of La Plata), and el único campeón de la ciudad (the only one champion of the city), because they are the only team in the city that has won an official tournament.

For several years, many chants incorporated the word Tricampeón (three-time champion) because of the Libertadores three-peat. After the 2009 Libertadores final, some of the newer lyrics use the word Tetracampeón (four-time champion).

Players

Current squad

Out on loan

Most goals scored

Most appearances

Top goalscorers in Primera
Players who have been top scorers in Primera División seasons:

Managers

Estudiantes de La Plata has had a long list of managers come up through its ranks who have gone on to become some of most influential and successful Argentine coaches. These include Guillermo Stábile, Osvaldo Zubeldía, Carlos Bilardo, Diego Simeone and Alejandro Sabella. 

 Guillermo Stábile (1940 – 1941)
 Alberto Zozaya (1945 – 1949)
 Neil McBain (1949 – 1951)
 Mario Fortunato (1954 – 1955)
 Miguel Ángel Lauri (1955)
 Manuel Ferreira (1955)
 Saúl Ongaro (1956)
 Ricardo Infante (1960)
 Saúl Ongaro (1962 – 1963)
 Carlos Aldabe (1963 – 1964)
 Osvaldo Zubeldía (Jan 1965 – Dec 1970)
 Carlos Bilardo (1971)
 José María Silvero (1972)
 Omar Sívori (1972)
 Carlos Bilardo (1973 – 1976)
 Eduardo Luján Manera (1977)
 Héctor Rial (1978)
 José Yudica (1980)
 Carlos Pachamé (1981)
 Carlos Bilardo (1982 – 1983)
 Eduardo Luján Manera (1983 – 1985)
 Humberto Zuccarelli (July 1985 – Jun 1986)
 Eduardo Luján Manera (1986)
 José Ramos Delgado (1987)
 Oscar Malbernat (1987 – 1988)
 Humberto Zuccarelli (Jul 1990 – 1991)
 Eduardo Flores (1991 – 1992)
 Luis Garisto (1992 – 1993)
 Enzo Trossero (1993 – 1994)
 Héctor Vargas (1994)
 Miguel Ángel Russo &  E. Luján Manera (1994 – 1995)
 Marcos Conigliaro (1995)
 Patricio Hernández (1998 – 1999)
 Néstor Craviotto (2000 – 2002)
 Oscar Malbernat (2002 – 2003)
 Carlos Pachamé (2003)
 Carlos Bilardo (2003 – 2004)
 Reinaldo Merlo (Jul 2004 – Apr 2005)
 Jorge Burruchaga (Jul 2005 – Jun 2006)
 Diego Simeone (May 2006 − Dec 2007)
 Roberto Sensini (Jan 2008 – Sep 2008)
 Leonardo Astrada (Sep 2008 – Mar 2009)
 Alejandro Sabella (Mar 2009 − Feb 2011)
 Eduardo Berizzo (Feb 2011 – May 2011)
 Miguel Ángel Russo (Jul 2011 − Nov 2011)
 Juan Manuel Azconzábal (Nov 2011 – Apr 2012)
 Diego Cagna (Jul 2012 − Apr 2013)
 Mauricio Pellegrino (Apr 2013 – Apr 2015)
 Gabriel Milito (Apr 2015 – Dec 2015)
 Nelson Vivas (Dec 2015 – Jun 2017)
   Gustavo Matosas (Jun 2017 – Sep 2017)
 Lucas Bernardi (Sep 2017 – May 2018)
 Leandro Benítez (Jun 2018 – Feb 2019)
 Gabriel Milito (11 Mar 2019–5 Mar 2020)
 Leandro Desábato &  Rodrigo Braña (2020 (interims))

Honours

National

League
Primera División (6): 1913 FAF, 1967 Metropolitano, 1982 Metropolitano, 1983 Nacional, 2006 Apertura, 2010 Apertura
Primera B Nacional (1): 1994–95
Primera B (2): 1935, 1954
Intermedia (1): 1911

National cups
Copa Adrián C. Escobar (1): 1944
Copa Gral. P. Ramírez (1): 1945

Other cups
 Copa Bullrich (1): 1919

International
Copa Libertadores (4): 1968, 1969, 1970, 2009
Intercontinental Cup (1): 1968
Copa Interamericana (1): 1968

Notes

References

External links

 

 
Multi-sport clubs in Argentina
Association football clubs established in 1905
Football clubs in Buenos Aires Province
e
Basketball teams in Buenos Aires Province
Argentine volleyball teams
Argentine handball clubs
Golf clubs and courses in Argentina
1905 establishments in Argentina
Sport in La Plata
Copa Libertadores winning clubs
Intercontinental Cup winning clubs
Copa Interamericana winning clubs